Creswick  is a town in west-central Victoria, Australia, 18 kilometres north of Ballarat and 122 kilometres northwest of Melbourne, in the Shire of Hepburn. It is 430 metres above sea level. At the 2016 census, Creswick had a population of 3,170. Creswick was named after the Creswick family, the pioneer settlers of the region.

History

The area was inhabited by the Dja Dja Wurrung people before white settlement. The pioneer white settlers were Henry, Charles and John Creswick, three brothers who started a large sheep station in 1842.

Creswick is a former gold-mining town, established during the Victorian gold rushes in the 1850s. The Post Office opened on 1 September 1854 but was named Creswick's Creek until around 1857. The population reached a peak of 25,000 during the gold rush. Today, local industries include forestry, grazing and agriculture.

Creswick was the site of the New Australasian Gold Mine disaster on 12 December 1882, Australia's worst mining disaster in which 22 men drowned.

The Creswick Magistrates' Court closed on 1 January 1983, not having been visited by a Magistrate since 1976.

Creswick was used as a filming location for the 2004 American television miniseries adaptation of Stephen King's Salem's Lot, which starred Rob Lowe, Donald Sutherland, Rutger Hauer and James Cromwell. Most of the supporting cast were Australian actors.

The town today
The original Victorian School of Forestry was established in 1910 by the Department of Forestry. It was the first institution set up in Victoria to train and accredit young foresters. Now the campus is part of The University of Melbourne. The campus is situated in Water Street and houses the School of Forest & Ecosystem Science, a highly regarded research and teaching institution.

Creswick has three primary schools—two government and one Catholic: Creswick Primary School, Creswick North Primary School and St Augustine's Primary School respectively.

The town also has an aged care facility. John Curtin Aged Care was formerly the township's health care hospital, but was converted to a nursing home in 1998.

Features

Attractions
 The Creswick Mens Friendship Shed. It is one of Australian original founding Men's Sheds. It has one of longest running Men's shed in Australia. Its Starting in 2001 at the Nurses Quarters at Creswick Hospital. It moved to a shanty Clad Building at Park Lake. It provides community support to its locals and its community. Creswick Men's Friendship opens on days, as needed by the community Members. It primary running day is Tuesday but also opens on Thursdays for Men. On Wednesdays they are temporarily running a Woman's Group and its goal is to continue for the long term as the needs continue. Creswick Men's Friendship Shed is in Partnership with Creswick Hospital and Community Health Center. It is has little to no support from its Local Shire Council. It is a Valuable part of community for resources information on Health Support. It Currently operates at 15 Bridge Street Creswick." Beside the Park lake House that was used by the Mens' Shed but Council unwillingness to maintenance made it unsafe and unusable to its Men's Shed Group. The Current Creswick Men's Shed is on Crown Land and supported by its Community, Creswick Hospital and Community Health Services and Many Volunteers.

 The Creswick Bazaar is held on the third Saturday and Sunday of the month at the historic railway precinct in Raglan Street. The Bazaar features crafts by local people.  The railway station, one of the best restored railway stations in Victoria, was restored by a group of volunteers. The railway goods shed hosts the Bazaar and other community events.
 The Creswick Market is located at (Creswick Neighbourhood Centre ), Victoria Street, Creswick. Held the third Saturday of every month from 9am to 1pm, Creswick Market features: free live music; kids' entertainment and playground; beautiful gardens to relax in; freshly made delicacies and great coffee; hand-made arts, crafts, jewellery and clothes; homegrown fruit, vegetables and plants; over 90 specialist boutique sites.
 The Creswick Woollen Mills, established in 1947, is the last remaining coloured spinning mill of its kind in Australia, still owned and run by the founder's family. It produces natural fibre products such as woollen blankets, throws and accessories. The mill is open seven days a week and operates a self-guided tour and shop.
 The Creswick Museum is situated at two addresses. The museum in the old Creswick Town Hall is open weekends and public holidays from 11am until 3.30pm. The Research Centre, operating out of the former Infant Child Centre, is open Friday and Saturday 11am to 3.00pm.
 Creswick has a range of singletrack trails suitable for both mountain biking and trail running. The Annual Brackenbury Mountain Bike Challenge in November attracts participants from across Australia. These trails have been identifies as a venue for Mountain biking during the 2026 Commonwealth Games held across Victoria.
 The iridescent blue of Creswick's Blue Waters lake is a draw for photography enthusiasts. The former open cut mine is located within Creswick Regional park, off Melbourne Road and just minutes from the town centre.

Sport
 The Creswick Bowling Club, which was originally situated in the middle of town, has since relocated to the Lindsay Park complex after several flooding incidents in late 2010 and early 2011, offers lawn bowling for women and men during the spring, summer and autumn months.
 The town has an Australian Rules football team competing in the Central Highlands Football League.
 Golfers play at The RACV Resort on the Midland Highway. The Forest Resort is a multi-storied building that is used for vacationing and conferences. It also has a gymnasium, heated pool, spa, library and health spa on the top floor.
 The Creswick Imperials cricket club play home games at Doug Lindsay recreational reserve. The A grade and A reserve teams play in the Maryborough & District Cricket Association whilst arguably their most popular team will compete in the Ballarat Cricket Association one day B grade competition for the 2016/17 season after having convincingly triumphed in the C grade in 2015/16.

Notable people

Creswick is the birthplace of the Lindsays, perhaps Australia's best known art family. Famous Lindsays (in birth order) were Percy Lindsay (landscape painter), Sir Lionel Lindsay (printmaker, painter and critic), Norman Lindsay (painter, sculptor and writer), Ruby Lindsay (illustrator) and Sir Daryl Lindsay (painter and arts administrator). Percy Lindsay painted many landscapes of the town and Norman Lindsay immortalised the town in his novel Redheap, a work that was banned for many years.

Other famous Creswickians include John Curtin, Australia's Prime Minister during World War II; Sir Alexander Peacock, a Victorian Premier; Sir Hayden Starke, a Justice of the High Court; and early trade unionists William Spence and David Temple, co-founders of the Australian Shearers' Union and Amalgamated Shearers' Union, which evolved into the Australian Workers' Union.

Transport
Creswick is located on the Midland Highway. Creswick railway station is served by V/Line train services to and from Maryborough, as well as buses from Ballarat operated by CDC Ballarat.

References

External links

 Australian Places - Creswick

Mining towns in Victoria (Australia)
Towns in Victoria (Australia)